Nesselroad is an unincorporated community in Jackson County, West Virginia, United States. Nesselroad once had a post office, which is now closed.

An early postmaster named Nesselroad gave the community his name.

References

Unincorporated communities in Jackson County, West Virginia
Unincorporated communities in West Virginia